Red Crescent Rupayan Tower (known as Red Crescent Tower) is a 45-storey  skyscraper currently under construction in the city of Dhaka, Bangladesh.

See also
List of tallest buildings in Bangladesh
List of tallest buildings in Dhaka
List of tallest buildings and structures in the Indian subcontinent
List of tallest buildings and structures in the world by country

References

Skyscrapers in Bangladesh
Buildings and structures in Dhaka
Buildings and structures under construction